Salem Evangelical Church in Plain, Wisconsin, also known as Salem United Methodist Church of Honey Creek Township, is a Gothic Revival church built in 1875. It was listed on the National Register of Historic Places in 1988. The congregation, which was formed in 1844, was the focus of the Swiss community.

References

United Methodist churches in Wisconsin
Churches in Sauk County, Wisconsin
Churches on the National Register of Historic Places in Wisconsin
Gothic Revival church buildings in Wisconsin
Churches completed in 1875
Swiss-American culture in Wisconsin
19th-century Methodist church buildings in the United States
National Register of Historic Places in Sauk County, Wisconsin